Nordsee-Ost offshore wind farm is an offshore wind farm in operation in the eastern part of the North Sea German sector. The project was developed by RWE Innogy, a subsidiary of RWE.

The wind farm consists of 48 turbines with a total capacity of 295 MW. The 6.15 MW turbines were provided by REpower.  Steel foundations for generators were supplied by Aker Verdal. Power converters were supplied by Woodward Governor Company. A consortium of Siemens and Prysmian built the high-voltage direct current submarine cable from the wind farm to the German transmission system operated by Transpower, a subsidiary of TenneT.

Delays in power line construction by Dutch TenneT delayed its operational start.

On 11 May 2015 the wind farm was officially put into operation.

See also

 Wind power in Germany

References

Wind farms in Germany
Offshore wind farms in the North Sea
RWE
Energy infrastructure completed in 2015
2015 establishments in Germany